Tehran, Rey, Shemiranat, Eslamshahr and Pardis is a constituency for the Parliament of Iran encompassing the metropolitan area of Tehran and some of its satellite cities. 

It has 30 seats, the most among all constituencies nationwide and plays an outsized role in shaping politics nationally, having been described as a "bellwether for elite sentiment in Iran". The constituency's seats have been the most prestigious in the country because it includes the country's capital city, and has had lively press and voters.

Current MPs

Elections

Since 1980

1st term

2nd term

3rd term

4th term

5th term

6th term

7th term

8th term

9th term

10th term

11th term

References 

Electoral districts of Iran